Uluyatır, also known as Mizar, is a village in Nizip District of Gaziantep Province, Turkey. 

The main crops of Uluyatır are olive groundnut, pomegranate and carrot. Uluyatır is inhabited by Turkmens.

References

Villages in Nizip District